Ceropegia evansii is a species of flower in the family Asclepiadoideae. It is found in the Indian state of Maharashtra and is allegedly difficult to find, residing at high elevations in bushes.

References 

evansii